Csaba Bogdány (born 15 May 1981 in Balassagyarmat) is a Hungarian football player. He plays for Mezőkövesd-Zsóry SE in the Nemzeti Bajnokság I.
He played his first league match in 2013.

Club statistics

Honours
Mezőkövesd
NB II Kelet (1): 2012–13

References

MLSZ

1981 births
Living people
People from Balassagyarmat
Hungarian footballers
Association football midfielders
Mezőkövesdi SE footballers
Nemzeti Bajnokság I players
Sportspeople from Nógrád County